George Henry Barnes (22 May 1899 – 1 June 1961) was an English amateur footballer who played in the Football League for Watford as a forward. He is probably best remembered for his time in non-League football with Chesham United, captaining the club and later presiding as chairman.

Personal life 
Barnes' brother Maurice was killed during a Chesham United match in which both brothers were playing. He worked as a boot manufacturer in Chesham.

Career statistics

References 

English footballers
English Football League players
1899 births
1961 deaths
People from Chesham
Association football outside forwards
Association football inside forwards
Watford F.C. players
Chesham United F.C. players
Brentford F.C. players